Bing Maps (previously Live Search Maps, Windows Live Maps, Windows Live Local, and MSN Virtual Earth) is a web mapping service provided as a part of Microsoft's Bing suite of search engines and powered by the Bing Maps Platform framework. Since 2020, the map data is provided by TomTom.

History

Bing Maps was originally launched as MSN Virtual Earth, which was released for beta testing on July 24, 2005. It was a continuation of previous Microsoft technologies such as Microsoft MapPoint and TerraServer. Its original stand out feature was the aerial imagery. The original version lacked many of its distinguishing features, including birds' eye view and 3D maps, and the Collections functionality was limited to a single "Scratchpad" of points of interest.

In December 2005, Virtual Earth was replaced by Windows Live Local, featuring improvements, technologies from Pictometry International, and integrated with the Local Search index on Windows Live Search. On November 6, 2006, Microsoft added the ability to view the maps in 3D using a .NET managed control and managed interfaces to Direct3D. Microsoft subsequently referred to this product officially as "Live Search Maps", integrating it as part of its Live Search services.

On June 3, 2009, Microsoft officially rebranded Live Search Maps as Bing Maps, and the Virtual Earth platform as Bing Maps for Enterprise.

In 2010, Microsoft added an OpenStreetMap layer to Bing Maps. From 2012, Nokia (formerly Navteq) powered many aspects of Bing Maps as an extension to its Windows Phone 7 partnership with Microsoft, including mapping data, geocoding, traffic data and navigation.

On June 1, 2020 it was announced the base map data of the Bing Maps Platform would now be sourced from TomTom.

Updates
 v1 (Beagle) (July 2005)
 v2 (Calypso) (December 2005) - "Bird's-eye imagery" released
 v2.5 (February 2006)
 v3 (Discovery) (May 2006) - Real time traffic, collections, new API
 v4 (Endeavour) (September 2006) - People search, drawing on maps, new imagery
 v5 (Spaceland) (November 2006) - 3D viewer, building models in 15 cities
 Data update (December 2006) - New 3D models and high-resolution imagery for 6 new areas
 Data update (January 2007) - Over 100 European cities with bird's-eye coverage added
 Data update (29 March 2007) - 3.8TB of bird's-eye imagery, orthophotos and 3D models of 5 British cities
 v5.5 (Falcon) (3 April 2007) VE 3D plugin for Firefox, GeoRSS support, area calculations
 v6 (Gemini) (15 October 2007) - New data, party maps, traffic based routing, v6 MapControl, Bird's Eye in 3D, etc.
 v6.1 (GoliatH) (10 April 2008) - Improved quality of 3D models, improved KML support and new export capabilities, street labels on Bird's Eye imagery, MapCruncher integration, HD filming capabilities, Clearflow traffic report system
 v6.2 (Helios) (24 September 2008) - Multi-point driving directions, landmarks in directions, weather, real stars, new data
 Data Update (29 December 2008) - 48TB of road network data
 v6.2 (Ikonos) (14 April 2009) - Performance improvements
 Bing (3 June 2009)
 Bing Maps Silverlight Beta (2 December 2009) - Silverlight, Twitter, Streetside
 (Oslo) (11 June 2010) - Silverlight improvements
 (Boston M4) (December 2010) - New map style Venue maps

Imagery updates
Bing maps frequently update and expand the geographic areas covered by their imagery, with new updates being released on roughly a monthly basis. Each imagery release typically contains more than 10TB of imagery.

However, the necessary time-lapse before images are updated means that aerial and Bird's-Eye images for a particular location can sometimes be several years out-of-date. This is particularly noticeable in locations that have undergone rapid recent development or experienced other dramatic changes since the imagery was taken, such as areas affected by natural disasters.

Features

Street maps
Users can browse and search topographically-shaded street maps for many cities worldwide. Maps include certain points of interest built in, such as metro stations, stadiums, hospitals, and other facilities. It is also possible to browse public user-created points of interest. Searches can cover public collections, businesses or types of business, locations, or people. Five street map views are available: Road View, Aerial View, Bird's Eye View, Street Side View, and 3D View.

Road view
Road view is the default map view and displays vector imagery of roads, buildings, and geography. The data from which the default road map is rendered is licensed from Navteq. In certain parts of the world, road view maps from alternative data providers are also available. For example, when viewing a map of London, the user may see road data from the Collins Bartholomew London Street Map. In all parts of the UK, road data from the Ordnance Survey can also be displayed. A Bing Maps app is available that will display road data from OpenStreetMap.

Aerial view
Aerial view overlays satellite imagery onto the map and highlights roads and major landmarks for easy identification amongst the satellite images. Since end of November 2010, OpenStreetMap mappers have been able to use imagery of Bing Aerial as a map background.

At the end of January 2012, both Bing Aerial and Birds Eye View imagery at military bases in Germany became blurred. This was on request of the German government obviously using data of OpenStreetMap.

Bird's-eye view
Bird's-eye view displays aerial imagery captured from low-flying aircraft. Unlike the top-down aerial view captured by satellite, Bird's-eye images are taken at an oblique 45-degree angle, showing the sides and roofs of buildings giving better depth perception for geography. With Bird's Eye views, many details such as signs, advertisements and pedestrians are clearly visible. Microsoft has occasionally removed Bird's Eye view from areas where it was previously available.

Streetside 

Streetside provides 360-degree imagery of street-level scenes taken from special cameras mounted on moving vehicles. Launched in December 2009 it contains imagery for selected metro areas in the United States as well as selected areas in Vancouver and Whistler, British Columbia associated with the 2010 Winter Olympic Games (example: Richmond Olympic Oval). Selected cities in Europe were also made available in May 2012. 
Between August and September 2011, German customers were allowed to appeal against integration of their house or flat in Bing Streetside. According to some officials, the number of appeals was significantly lower than with Google Street View. Only 40,000 requests were sent to Microsoft. In May 2012, Streetside imagery captured in Germany was removed entirely due to numerous requests.
For OpenStreetMap editors, display of Streetside tracks and images can be enabled via a map data layer checkbox.

Venue maps
Venue maps provide a way of seeing the layout of the venue. Currently, Bing Maps provides maps & level wise layouts of over 5300 venues across the world. The categories are: Airports, Amusement Parks, Buildings, Convention Centers, Hospitals, Malls, Museums, Parks, Racecourses, Racetracks, Resorts, Shopping Centers, Shopping Districts, Stadiums, Universities and Zoos.

3D maps
The 3D maps feature allows users to see the environment (e.g. buildings) in 3D, with the added ability to rotate and tilt the angle in addition to panning and zooming. To attempt to achieve near-photorealism, all 3D buildings are textured using composites of aerial photography. To view the 3D maps, users must install a plugin, then enable the "3D" option on "Bing Maps". In addition to exploring the maps using a mouse and keyboard, it is possible to navigate the 3D environment using an Xbox 360 controller or another game controller in Windows 7, Windows Vista or Windows XP.

More than 60 cities worldwide could be viewed in 3D, including most of the major cities in the United States and a few cities in Canada, the United Kingdom, and France. Some additional cities have had a select few important landmarks modelled in 3D, such as the Colosseum in Rome. Terrain data is available for the entire world. It is also possible to use a 3D modelling program called 3DVIA Shape for Maps to add one's own models to the 3D map. Since 2014, new 3D imagery has been introduced to a number of new cities.

Driving, walking, and transit directions
Users can get directions between two or more locations. In September 2010, Bing Maps added public transit directions (bus, subway, and local rail) to its available direction options. Although at the beginning it was only available in some cities: Boston, Chicago, Los Angeles, Minneapolis, Newark Metro Area, New York Metro Area, Philadelphia, San Francisco, Seattle, Vancouver BC, and Washington DC, now you can find information from all over.
A wide coverage is being attain in other countries such as Spain, Germany, Italy, Austria, Brazil, Mexico, Argentina, Colombia and many others.

Map apps

Bing Map Apps is a collection of 1st and 3rd party applications that add additional functionality and content to Bing Maps. Examples of map apps include a parking finder, a taxi fare calculator, an app that maps out Facebook friends, and an app which lets users explore the day's newspaper front pages from around the world. These apps are only accessible through Bing Maps Silverlight. A source code is available on Microsoft Developer Network to explain integration of Maps in Web Applications. A sample ongoing project on locating Blood Donors on Maps is available here.

Traffic information and ClearFlow
Bing Maps shows users current traffic information for major highways and roads. The feature uses 4 color codes (black, red, yellow, green) to indicate traffic volume, from heaviest traffic to lightest traffic.
Microsoft announced in March 2008 that it will release its latest software technology called "ClearFlow". It is a Web-based service for traffic-based driving directions available on Bing.com in 72 cities across the U.S. The tool took five years for Microsoft's Artificial Intelligence team to develop. ClearFlow provides real-time traffic data to help drivers avoid traffic congestion. ClearFlow gives information for alternative routes and supplies traffic conditions on city streets adjacent to highways. Clearflow anticipates traffic patterns, while taking into account sporting/arena events, time of day and weather conditions, and then reflects the back ups and their consequential spill over onto city streets. Often, ClearFlow found it may be faster to stay on the highway instead of seeking alternative side street routes, which involve traffic lights and congestion as well.

Sharing and embedding maps
Bing Maps allows users to share maps and embed maps into their websites. By clicking the e-mail icon in the bottom-left corner of Bing Maps, a window will open that displays a shareable URL so others can access the map currently being viewed. This window also provides HTML code to embed a small version of the map onto any web page.

Design
In August 2010, Bing Maps launched an overhauled design for its default view. The new colors create a more visually appealing backdrop for information delivery that helps content ‘pop’ on the map.  The backdrop provides clear differentiation for pushpins, labels and red, yellow and green traffic overlays.  These design principles also works well in black and white and creates differentiation for those with the most common forms of color blindness.
Also, larger fonts correspond to larger roads to help customers more easily identify main roads in cities.  More readable labels eliminate the need for bolding and less-attractive glows. The inclusion of neighborhood labels allows users to quickly find or convey locations in a commonly used and highly relevant format.

Other features

People, business, and location search
The search box at the top of Bing Maps can be used to locate places, businesses and landmarks, and people. Search results appear both on a left-side rail and as pushpins on the map (linked together by numbers). Search results often include addresses, contact information, and reviews for businesses and landmarks. For relevant searches, the user will also see a description of the landmark or place (powered by Wikipedia) if a Wikipedia article exists.
The search process can also be guided using local directories for numerous categories (restaurants, hotels, tourist attractions, retail stores, etc.).

User contributions
Bing Maps users can also view and add "user contributed" entries to the map. These user-contributions must be toggled on by users. Such items can include businesses, landmarks, buildings, and locations. Users can browse user-contributions by tags and subscribe to RSS feeds to receive updates of new user-contributions to a specific area.

Dynamic labels
In August 2010, Bing Maps added dynamic labels to its Silverlight experience (bing.com/maps/explore). Turn on the dynamic labels beta from the map style selector on bing.com/maps/explore and the labels become clickable.  This allows users to quickly zoom down to a region or location anywhere on the map with just a few clicks. Zooming back out in a single click is also possible by using the ‘breadcrumb’ trail at the top left of the map.

AJAX and Silverlight versions

Bing Maps has two separate versions for users: an AJAX version (located at Bing.com/Maps) and an opt-in Silverlight version (located at Bing.com/Maps/Explore—not available anymore) that requires Microsoft Silverlight to be installed. The Silverlight version is positioned to offer richer, more dynamic features and a smoother experience. In November 2010, the AJAX and Silverlight versions were combined into a semi-hybrid site where Silverlight features such as Map Apps and Streetside could be enabled through the Bing.com/Maps site - these features still required Silverlight to be installed, but does not require use of a separate Bing Maps site.

The AJAX and Silverlight site share the following features: Road View, Aerial View, Bird's-Eye View, Sharing Maps, People/Business/Location Search, Building Footprints, Driving Directions, Walking Directions.

Silverlight users exclusively can use Map Apps, StreetSide View, Photosynths, and Dynamic Labels.

Map apps

Access
Bing Map Apps are accessed either through the "Map Apps" button in the Bing Maps Explore Bar or through direct perma-links. The Map Apps button is only viewable if the user is in the Bing Maps Silverlight experience or in Windows 8.

Third-party apps
Bing Map Apps also allows third parties to create and submit map apps. The following are a list of 3rd party map apps:

Map coverage

Global Ortho Program
In July 2010, Microsoft and DigitalGlobe, a provider of high-resolution earth imagery, announced the collection of the first imagery from the company's Advanced Ortho Aerial Program. Through a special agreement with Microsoft, the Advanced Ortho Aerial Program will provide wall-to-wall 30 cm aerial coverage of the contiguous United States and Western Europe that DigitalGlobe has the exclusive rights to distribute beyond Bing Maps. The program's first orthophoto mosaics are of Augusta, GA, San Diego, CA and Tampa, FL, and can be viewed on DigitalGlobe's website.

Americas

Africa

Europe

Asia / Oceania

Middle East

Compatibility
Microsoft states that Bing Maps needs the following environment:

 Windows XP with SP2 or a later version
 Microsoft .NET Framework 2.0
 Windows Imaging Component
 250 MB or more of hard disk space
 A 1.0-gigahertz (GHz) processor (2.8 GHz or faster is recommended)
 256 MB of system memory (1 GB is recommended)
 A 32-MB video card (256 MB is recommended) that supports Microsoft DirectX 9, with 3D hardware acceleration enabled
 A high-speed or broadband Internet connection

Compatible browsers include Windows Internet Explorer 6 or later, Mozilla Firefox 3.0 or later, or Safari 3.1 or later. Opera is stated to be usable "with some functionality limitations". Users of browsers that are not considered compatible, as well as users of versions of compatible browsers that are not supported, will be directed away from viewing the map without an error message.

The 3D Maps viewer plug-in requires Microsoft Windows XP Service Pack 2, Microsoft Windows Server 2003, Windows Vista, or Windows 7 with Internet Explorer 6/7/8 or Firefox 1.5/2.0/3.0.

See also 
 Tencent Maps
 Here WeGo
 Yahoo! Maps
 MapQuest
 Apple Maps
 Google Maps
 Google Earth
 OpenStreetMap

References

External links
 Bing Maps
 Bing Maps for different regions
 Bing Maps Interactive source SDK
 Official Bing Maps team blog
 Bing Maps for Enterprise and Government

Maps
Virtual globes
Web mapping
Web Map Services
Keyhole Markup Language
Route planning software
Windows components
Universal Windows Platform apps
Computer-related introductions in 2011